Joseph Nicholas Anthony Macerollo, OC (born October 1, 1944) is a Canadian classical accordionist and music teacher. He was appointed an Officer of the Order of Canada in 2013.

References 
 Joseph Macerollo | The Canadian Encyclopedia
 The Magical Joseph Macerollo
 Mr. Joseph Macerollo

1944 births
Living people
Officers of the Order of Canada
Canadian accordionists
Canadian music educators
University of Toronto alumni
Academic staff of Queen's University at Kingston
Academic staff of Wilfrid Laurier University
Academic staff of the University of Toronto
Musicians from Ontario
20th-century Canadian musicians
21st-century Canadian musicians